Brevicipitidae or rain frogs is a small family of frogs found in eastern and southern Africa. As of 2020 contains 37 species in 5 genera. Formerly included as subfamily in Microhylidae (narrow-mouth frogs), phylogenetic research has indicated the brevicipitine frogs should be considered as a family with Hemisotidae (shovelnose frogs) as the most closely related sister taxon.

Most adult brevicipitine frogs are not easily seen as they spend extended periods of time in soil or leaf litter. However, some species might be partly arboreal at times. Many species show strong sexual size dimorphism, with females being much larger than males.

At least the frogs in Breviceps and Probreviceps genera breed by direct development, in which small froglets emerge from eggs without intervening aquatic tadpole phase. It is likely that the same applies to the other genera, too. Because male Breviceps frogs are smaller than their female counterparts, amplexus is not possible; however mating pairs glue themselves together using excretions from holocrine glands on the ventrum of the male and similar glands on the dorsum of the back of the female. The frogs lay small clutches of 13–56 fairly large eggs (4–8 mm diameter not including the protective capsule) in cover, often in burrows. With some species either male or female stays with eggs or close to the egg chamber, though the details and extent of brood care is poorly understood within Brevicipitidae as a whole.

Genera 
 Balebreviceps  (1 species)
 Breviceps  (20 species)
 Callulina  (9 species)
 Probreviceps  (6 species)
 Spelaeophryne  (1 species)

References 

 
Amphibian families
Taxa named by Charles Lucien Bonaparte
Afrotropical realm fauna